Bahari is an American alt pop, electronic and dark pop musical duo, previously a trio, composed of Ruby Carr and Natalia Panzarella. Sidney Sartini left the band in 2018.

History

Formation, signing with Interscope and Dancing on the Sun (2014–2017)
The group consists of vocalist and keyboardist Ruby Carr, who is from South Africa and was raised in Kenya; vocalist and bassist Natalia Panzarella, from Nashville, Tennessee and raised in Los Angeles. They met at a production team in Rock Mafia's studio while working in each member's individual projects. The girls met and started making music together and formed the group, then called Bahari. They signed with Interscope Records and the first song they wrote, "Wild Ones", was released as their debut single on December 30, 2014. It gained popularity online, reaching more than 40 million streams on Spotify and being featured in TV series Teen Wolf and The Royals. The music video was released on April 5, 2016, directed by Darnell Williams. They also appeared in the song "Addicted to a Memory", featured on Zedd's second studio album True Colors.

Their debut extended play, Dancing on the Sun was released on May 13, 2016, with the title track being the first single. Its music video, filmed in the Sequoia National Forest and directed by Marcus Haney was released as an Apple Music exclusive on May 5, 2018. It impacted contemporary hit radio on May 10, 2018, and appeared on TV shows Supergirl and So You Think You Can Dance. They also released music videos for the songs "Altar of the Sun" and "Reasons", also directed by Haney.

During summer 2016, they toured as a supporting act for Birdy as well as for Selena Gomez's Revival Tour. On January 13, 2017, a collaboration with Grey called "I Miss You" was released, with its music video directed by Tobias Nathan being released on April 13, 2017. On January 20, 2017, a cover of The Youngbloods, "Get Together" was put out as a single. Its music video, directed by Darnell Williams and Sam Sturges, was released on January 24, 2017, and the track was featured on the TV series Riverdale.

Departure from Interscope, self-released singles and exit of Sidney Sartini (2018)
After leaving Interscope, they released some independent singles through 2018; "Fucked Up" on February, which music video was directed by Zac Wolf and premiered in May; the promotional Buffalo Springfield cover "For What It's Worth" in March; "Savage" in April and "Chasers" in July. These releases marked an evolution from the band's initial sound to a more "edgy" pop and electronic approach. Release of their debut album was set in fall 2018.

On December 7, 2018, Bahari announced on the band's official Twitter that Sidney Sartini had "made the choice to go her own way and leave Bahari." They added, "we support her with all of our hearts and love her endlessly." Their last performance as a trio was October 18, 2018.

Collaborations, signing with Epic Records and Forget You (2019-present)

During 2019, Bahari were featured in Illenium's single "Crashing", later included on his debut album Ascend. They also released  some self-released singles as ":(" (also named "Sad Face"), their collaboration with Sultan & Shepard and Rock Mafia "Miles to Your Heart" and "Gameboy".

In 2020 Bahari accompanied Elohim on her US "Group Therapy Tour." They later signed with Epic Records. Their first release with the label was a remix featuring Bia of their previously released viral hit "Savage" on July 17, 2020 along its music video directed by Russell Tandy. On July 31, the duo released their single "Waking Up the Neighbors", which was initially set to be included in their debut studio album. The music video, directed by SVN QNS, premiered the same day. Two more singles "Bipolar" and "Jackie Kennedy" were released on March 5, 2021. The music video for the first, directed by Michael Jurkovac, was unveiled the same day while the one for the second, directed by Nate Mohler, premiered on April 16. Their second EP Forget You was released on July 9.

Band members
 Ruby Carr – vocals, keyboard (2014–present)
 Natalia Panzarella – vocals, bass (2014–present)
 Sidney Sartini – vocals, guitar (2014–2018)

Discography

Extended plays

Singles

As lead artist

As featured artist

Promotional singles

Music videos

As lead artist

As featured artist

References

External links
 

American musical duos
American musical trios
American electronic music groups
American indie pop groups
Musical groups established in 2014
Musical groups from California
2014 establishments in California